San Martino is a Roman Catholic church in Pisa, region of Tuscany, Italy,  facing piazza San Martino, on the left bank of the Arno river.

History
Documents from 1067 cite a church of "San Martino in Guazzolongo" (name of the quartiere), belonging to the Augustinian order. It was rebuilt in 1331, under the commission of Bonifacio Novello della Gherardesca, who wished to endow a convent a nuns of an Order of Saint Clare. From 1395, it was considered "cappella del Santissimo Sacramento". The lower façade dates from this epoch, while the superior portion was not completed until 1610.

Description 
The rectangular shape is typical of Franciscan order churches of its time, such as the contemporary churches of San Francesco and Santa Caterina. The remains of a bell-tower are visible. The polychrome ceramic baptismpal font is now found in the Museo Nazionale di San Matteo. The Marble facade has a copy of the bas relief of San Martino and the poor man attributed to Andrea Pisano; the original is kept inside.

The interior, reconstructed in the 17th century conserves a painted wooden Crucifix by the 13th-century Pisan painter Enrico di Tedice; in the ceiling of the chapel of the Holy Sacrament, there are 14th-century frescoes depicting Redeemer and Saints by  Giovanni di Nicola  and Cecco di Pietro . On the wall are stories of the virgin by Antonio Veneziano.

The altars contain a number of prominent works of 17th century painters including Palma il Giovane, Orazio Riminaldi, Jacopo Ligozzi, il Domenico Passignano  and dei Melani. The church contains the funeral monument of Marchese Francesco Del Testa by Giovanni Antonio Cybei with a portrait in marble relief (1780).

Martino
14th-century Roman Catholic church buildings in Italy
1610 establishments in Italy
17th-century Roman Catholic church buildings in Italy
Roman Catholic churches completed in 1610